Toms Creek is a  tributary of the Monocacy River in Pennsylvania and Maryland in the United States.  Via the Monocacy River, it is part of the Potomac River watershed, flowing to Chesapeake Bay and the Atlantic Ocean.

The creek rises on South Mountain in southwestern Adams County, Pennsylvania, and flows south, then southeast, through Iron Springs and Carroll Valley, Pennsylvania, and past Emmitsburg, Maryland.

See also
List of rivers of Maryland   
List of rivers of Pennsylvania

References

Rivers of Pennsylvania
Rivers of Maryland
Rivers of Adams County, Pennsylvania
Tributaries of the Monocacy River
Rivers of Frederick County, Maryland